The 1988 RTHK Top 10 Gold Songs Awards was held in 1988 for the 1987 music season.

Top 10 song awards
The top 10 songs (十大中文金曲) of 1988 are as follows.

Other awards

References
 RTHK top 10 gold song awards 1988

RTHK Top 10 Gold Songs Awards
Rthk Top 10 Gold Songs Awards, 1988
Rthk Top 10 Gold Songs Awards, 1988